William Clarkson (1859–1934) was a co-founder and Admiral of the Royal Australian Navy

William Clarkson, Willy Clarkson, Bill Clarkson or Billy Clarkson may also refer to:

Willy Clarkson (1861–1934), theatrical costume designer and wigmaker
Billy Clarkson (1891–1954), English professional footballer
William Clarkson (cricketer), 1920s Warwickshire cricketer
William Clarkson (missionary), 19th-century Irish missionary 
William Herbert Clarkson (1872–?), artist 
Bill Clarkson (1898–1971), pitcher in Major League Baseball

See also
 Clarkson (disambiguation)
 Clarkson (surname)